Solomon Islands–Venezuela relations are the diplomatic relations between Solomon Islands and Venezuela.

History 

In October 2008 Solomons Prime Minister Derek Sikua moved to establish economic relations with Venezuela, hoping to benefit from comparatively cheap Venezuelan oil. In the context of the financial crisis of 2007–2008, it was believed that it would bring down the price of oil for Solomon Islanders, and boost the economy if the Solomons imported crude Venezuelan oil, refined it and then exported it to neighbouring countries.

References 

Venezuela
Solomon Islands